Multimedia  is a form of communication that uses a combination of different content forms such as text, audio, images, animations, or video into a single interactive presentation, in contrast to traditional mass media, such as printed material or audio recordings, which features little to no interaction between users. Popular examples of multimedia include video podcasts, audio slideshows and animated videos. Multimedia also contains the principles and application of effective interactive communication such as the building blocks of software, hardware, and other technologies. The five main building blocks of multimedia are text, image, audio, video, and animation. 

Multimedia can be recorded for playback on computers, laptops, smartphones, and other electronic devices. In the early years of multimedia, the term "rich media" was synonymous with interactive multimedia. Over time, hypermedia extensions brought multimedia to the World Wide Web and streaming services became more common.

Terminology 
The term multimedia was coined by singer and artist Bob Goldstein (later 'Bobb Goldsteinn') to promote the July 1966 opening of his "Lightworks at L'Oursin" show in Southampton, New York, Long Island. Goldstein was perhaps aware of an American artist named Dick Higgins, who had two years previously discussed a new approach to art-making he called "intermedia".

Before the invention of the term, the idea of multimedia could be taken back to when the 19th century composer Richard Wagner believed in the concept of Gesamtkunstwerk, meaning 'total artwork'. Wagner strived to combine multiple art forms- opera, drama, music - to create a perfect synthesis on stage. He looked down on the Grand Opera at the time, which emphasized individual talent, rather than the complete work as a whole. By combining these art forms, Wagner believed the most profound art could be made.

On August 10, 1966, Richard Albarino of Variety borrowed the terminology, reporting: "Brainchild of song scribe-comic Bob ('Washington Square') Goldstein, the 'Lightworks' is the latest multi-media music-cum-visuals to debut as discothèque fare." Two years later, in 1968, the term "multimedia" was re-appropriated to describe the work of a political consultant, David Sawyer, the husband of Iris Sawyer—one of Goldstein's producers at L'Oursin.

 In the intervening forty years, the word has taken on different meanings. In the late 1970s, the term referred to presentations consisting of multi-projector slide shows timed to an audio track. However, by the 1990s 'multimedia' took on its current meaning.

In the 1993 first edition of Multimedia: Making It Work, Tay Vaughan declared "Multimedia is any combination of text, graphic art, sound, animation, and video that is delivered by computer. When you allow the user – the viewer of the project – to control what and when these elements are delivered, it is interactive multimedia. When you provide a structure of linked elements through which the user can navigate, interactive multimedia becomes hypermedia."

The German language society Gesellschaft für deutsche Sprache recognized the word's significance and ubiquitousness in the 1990s by awarding it the title of German 'Word of the Year' in 1995. The institute summed up its rationale by stating "[Multimedia] has become a central word in the wonderful new media world".

In common usage, multimedia refers to an electronically delivered combination of media including video, still images, audio, and text in such a way that can be accessed interactively. Much of the content on the web today falls within this definition as understood by millions. Some computers which were marketed in the 1990s were called "multimedia" computers because they incorporated a CD-ROM drive, which allowed for the delivery of several hundred megabytes of video, picture, and audio data. That era saw also a boost in the production of educational multimedia CD-ROMs. A standard CD-ROM can hold on average 700 megabytes of data, while the maximum size a 3.5 inch floppy disk can hold is 2.8 megabytes, with an average of 1.44 megabytes. 

The term "video", if not used exclusively to describe motion photography, is ambiguous in multimedia terminology. Video is often used to describe the file format, delivery format, or presentation format instead of "footage"  which is used to distinguish motion photography from "animation" of rendered motion imagery. Multiple forms of information content are often not considered modern forms of presentation such as audio or video. Likewise, single forms of information content with single methods of information processing (e.g. non-interactive audio) are often called multimedia, perhaps to distinguish static media from active media. In the fine arts, for example, Leda Luss Luyken's ModulArt brings two key elements of musical composition and film into the world of painting: variation of a theme and movement of and within a picture, making ModulArt an interactive multimedia form of art. Performing arts may also be considered multimedia considering that performers and props are multiple forms of both content and media.

In modern times, a multimedia device can be referred to an electronic device, such as a smartphone, a video game system, or a computer. Each and everyone of these devices have a main function, but also have other uses beyond their intended purpose, such as reading, writing, recording video and audio, listening to music, and playing video games. This has lend them to be called "multimedia devices". While previous media was always local, many are now handled through web based solutions, particularly streaming.

Major characteristics 
Multimedia presentations are presentations featuring multiple types of media. The different types of media can include text, graphics, audio, video and animations. These different types of media convey information to their target audience and effectively communicate with them. Videos are a great visual example to use in multimedia presentations because they can create visual aids to the presenter's ideas. They are commonly used among education and many other industries to benefit students and workers, as they effectively retain chunks of information in a limited amount of time and can be stored easily. Another example is charts and graphs, as the presenters can show their audience the trends using data associated with their researches. This provides the audience a visual idea of a company's capabilities and performances.<ref></</ref> Audio also helps people understand the message being presented, as most modern videos are combined with audio to increase its efficiency, while animations are made to simplify things from the presenter's perspective. These technological methods allow efficient communication and understanding across a wide range of audiences (with an even wider range of abilities) throughout different fields. 

Multimedia games and simulations may be used in a physical environment with special effects, with multiple users in an online network, or locally with an offline computer, game system, or simulator.

The various formats of technological or digital multimedia may be intended to enhance the users' experience, for example to make it easier and faster to convey information. Or in entertainment or art, combine an array of artistic insights that includes elements from different art forms to engage, inspire, or captivate an audience.

Enhanced levels of interactivity are made possible by combining multiple forms of media content. Online multimedia is increasingly becoming object-oriented and data-driven, enabling applications with collaborative end-user innovation and personalization on multiple forms of content over time.  Examples of these range from multiple forms of content on Web sites like photo galleries with both images (pictures) and title (text) user-updated, to simulations whose co-efficients, events, illustrations, animations or videos are modifiable, allowing the multimedia "experience" to be altered without reprogramming. In addition to seeing and hearing, haptic technology enables virtual objects to be felt. Emerging technology involving illusions of taste and smell may also enhance the multimedia experience.

Categorization 
Multimedia may be broadly divided into linear and non-linear categories:
Linear active content progresses often without any navigational control, only focusing on the user to watch the entire piece by involving higher levels of emotional and sensory stimulation based on what's being shown as a cinema presentation;
Non-linear uses interactivity to control progress as with a video game or self-paced computer-based training so that the actions made will be based on how the user interacts within the simulated world. Hypermedia is an example of non-linear content.

Multimedia presentations can be live or recorded:
A recorded presentation may allow interactivity via a navigation system;
A live multimedia presentation may allow interactivity via an interaction with the presenter or performer.

Usage/application 

Multimedia finds its application in various areas including, but not limited to, advertisements, art, education, entertainment, engineering, medicine, mathematics, business, scientific research and spatial temporal applications. Several examples are as follows:

Creative industries 
Creative industries use multimedia for a variety of purposes ranging from fine arts, to entertainment, to commercial art, to journalism, to media and software services provided for any of the industries listed below. An individual multimedia designer may cover the spectrum throughout their career. Request for their skills range from technical, to analytical, to creative.

Commercial uses 
Much of the electronic old and new media used by commercial artists in multimedia.. Advertising companies rely heavily on social interfaces and television to promote products. Using these platforms, they are able to express their message or persuade a targeted audience. Business to business and interoffice communications are often developed by creative services firms for advanced multimedia presentations beyond simple slide shows to sell ideas or liven up training. Commercial multimedia developers may be hired to design for governmental services and nonprofit services applications as well. In addition, the prominence of data mining within multimedia platforms in order to adjust marketing techniques based on the data they mine is a crucial and notable practice of commercial advertisement to efficiently understand the demographic of a target audience. In recent years a new trend of multimedia has arrived, a new sort of digital billboard placed on the side of buildings and usually wrapping around the side of it. These take clips made at differing angles to trick the brain into seeing them as 3-Dimensional, like they're leaving the billboard entirely. This makes them eye-catching and therefore more likely to draw in people's attention which is of course, very good for commercial purposes.

Entertainment and fine arts 
Multimedia is heavily used in the entertainment industry, especially to develop special effects in movies and animations (VFX, 3D animation, etc.). Multimedia games are a popular pastime and are software programs available either as CD-ROMs or online. Video games are considered multimedia, as such games meld animation, audio, and interactivity to allow the player an immersive experience. While video games can vary in terms of animation style or audio type, the element of interactivity makes them a striking example of interactive multimedia. Interactive multimedia refers to multimedia applications that allow users to actively participate instead of just sitting by as passive recipients of information.
In the arts, there are multimedia artists who blend techniques using different media that in some way incorporate interaction with the viewer. Another approach entails the creation of multimedia that can be displayed in a traditional fine arts arena, such as an art gallery. Video has become an intrinsic part of many concerts and theatrical productions in the modern era, and has spawned content creation opportunities for many media professionals. Although multimedia display material may be volatile, the survivability of the content is as strong as any traditional media.

Education 
In education, multimedia is used to produce computer-based training courses (popularly called CBTs) and reference books like encyclopedia and almanacs. A CBT lets the user go through a series of presentations, text about a particular topic, and associated illustrations in various information formats.

Learning theory in the past decade has expanded dramatically because of the introduction of multimedia. Several lines of research have evolved, e.g. cognitive load and multimedia learning.

From multimedia learning (MML) theory, David Roberts has developed a large group lecture practice using PowerPoint and based on the use of full-slide images in conjunction with a reduction of visible text (all text can be placed in the notes view' section of PowerPoint). The method has been applied and evaluated in 9 disciplines. In each experiment, students’ engagement and active learning have been approximately 66% greater, than with the same material being delivered using bullet points, text, and speech, corroborating a range of theories presented by multimedia learning scholars like Sweller and Mayer. The idea of media convergence is also becoming a major factor in education, particularly higher education. Defined as separate technologies such as voice (and telephony features), data (and productivity applications), and video that now share resources and interact with each other, media convergence is rapidly changing the curriculum in universities all over the world. Higher education has been implementing the use of social media applications such as Twitter, YouTube, Facebook, etc. to increase student collaboration and develop new processes in how information can be conveyed to students.

Educational technology 

Multimedia provides students with an alternate means of acquiring knowledge designed to enhance teaching and learning through various mediums and platforms. In the 1960s, technology began to expand into the classrooms through devices such as screens and telewriters. This technology allows students to learn at their own pace and gives teachers the ability to observe the individual needs of each student. The capacity for multimedia to be used in multi-disciplinary settings is structured around the idea of creating a hands-on learning environment through the use of technology. Lessons can be tailored to the subject matter as well as be personalized to the students' varying levels of knowledge on the topic. Learning content can be managed through activities that utilize and take advantage of multimedia platforms. This kind of usage of modern multimedia encourages interactive communication between students and teachers and opens feedback channels, introducing an active learning process especially with the prevalence of new media and social media. Technology has impacted multimedia as it is largely associated with the use of computers or other electronic devices and digital media due to its capabilities concerning research, communication, problem-solving through simulations and feedback opportunities. The innovation of technology in education through the use of multimedia allows for diversification among classrooms to enhance the overall learning experience for students.

Social work 
Multimedia is a robust education methodology within the social work context. The five different multimedia which supports the education process are narrative media, interactive media, communicative media, adaptive media, and productive media. Contrary to long-standing belief, multimedia technology in social work education existed before the prevalence of the internet. It takes the form of images, audio, and video into the curriculum.

First introduced to social work education by Seabury & Maple in 1993, multimedia technology is utilized to teach social work practice skills including interviewing, crisis intervention, and group work. In comparison with conventional teaching method, including face-to-face courses, multimedia education shortens transportation time, increases knowledge and confidence in a richer and more authentic context for learning, generates interaction between online users, and enhances understanding of conceptual materials for novice students.

In an attempt to examine the impact of multimedia technology on students’ study, A. Elizabeth Cauble & Linda P. Thurston conducted a research in which Building Family Foundations (BFF), an interactive multimedia training platform, was utilized to assess social work students’ reactions to multimedia technology on variables of knowledge, attitudes, and self-efficacy. The results states that respondents show a substantial increase in academic knowledge, confidence, and attitude. Multimedia also benefits students because it brings expert to students online, fits students’ schedule, allows students to choose courses that suit them.

Mayer's Cognitive Theory of Multimedia Learning suggests, "people learn more from words and pictures than from words alone." According to Mayer and other scholars, multimedia technology stimulates people's brains by implementing visual and auditory effects, and thereby assists online users to learn efficiently. Researchers suggest that when users establish dual channels while learning, they tend to understand and memorize better. Mixed literature of this theory are still present in the field of multimedia and social work.

Language communication 
With the spread and development of the English language around the world, multimedia has become an important way of communicating between different people and cultures. Multimedia Technology creates a platform where language can be taught. The traditional form of teaching English as a Second Language in classrooms have drastically changed with the prevalence of technology, making easier for students to obtain language learning skills. Multimedia motivates students to learn more languages through audio, visual and animation support. It also helps create English contexts since an important aspect of learning a language is developing their grammar, vocabulary and knowledge of pragmatics and genres. In addition, cultural connections in terms of forms, contexts, meanings and ideologies have to be constructed. By improving thought patterns, multimedia develops students’ communicative competence by improving their capacity to understand the language. One of the studies, carried out by Izquierdo, Simard and Pulido, presented the correlation between "Multimedia Instruction (MI) and learners’ second language (L2)" and its effects on learning behavior. Their findings based on Gardner's theory of the "socio-educational model of learner motivation and attitudes", the study shows that there is easier access to language learning materials as well as increased motivation with MI along with the use of Computer-Assisted Language Learning.

Journalism 
Newspaper companies all over are trying to embrace the new phenomenon by implementing its practices in their work. While some have been slow to come around, other major newspapers like The New York Times, USA Today and The Washington Post are setting a precedent for the positioning of the newspaper industry in a globalized world. To keep up with the changing world of multimedia, journalistic practices are adopting and utilizing different multimedia functions through the inclusion of visuals such as varying audio, video, text, etc. in their writings.

News reporting is not limited to traditional media outlets. Freelance journalists can use different new media to produce multimedia pieces for their news stories. It engages global audiences and tells stories with technology, which develops new communication techniques for both media producers and consumers. The Common Language Project, later renamed to The Seattle Globalist, is an example of this type of multimedia journalism production.

Multimedia reporters who are mobile (usually driving around a community with cameras, audio and video recorders, and laptop computers) are often referred to as mojos, from mobile journalist.

Engineering 
Software engineers may use multimedia in computer simulations for anything from entertainment to training such as military or industrial training. Multimedia for software interfaces are often done as a collaboration between creative professionals and software engineers. Multimedia helps expand the teaching practices that can be found in engineering to allow for more innovated methods to not only educated future engineers, but to help evolve the scope of understanding of where multimedia can be used in specialized engineer careers like software engineers.

Multimedia is also allowing major car manufactures, such as Ford, and General Motors, to expand the design, and safety standards of their cars. By using a game engine and virtual reality glasses, these companies are able to test the safety features, and the design of the car, before a prototype is even made. Building a car virtually reduces the time it takes to produce new vehicles, cutting down on the time needed to test designs, and allowing the designers to make changes in real time. It also reduces expenses, since with a virtual car making real world prototypes is no longer needed.

Mathematical and scientific research 
In mathematical and scientific research, multimedia is mainly used for modeling and simulation. For example, a scientist can look at a molecular model of a particular substance and manipulate it to arrive at a new substance. Representative research can be found in journals such as the Journal of Multimedia. One well known example of this being applied would be in the movie Interstellar where Executive Director Kip Thorne helped create one of the most realistic depictions of a blackhole in film. The visual effects team under Paul Franklin took Kip Thorne's mathematical data and applied it into their own visual effects engine called "Double Negative Gravitational Renderer" a.k.a. "Gargantua", to create a "real" blackhole, used in the final cut. Later on the visual effects team went onto publish a blackhole study

Medicine 
Medical professionals and students have a wide variety of ways to learn new techniques and procedures through interactive media and online courses and lectures. The methods of conveying information to students have drastically evolved with the help of multimedia. From the 1800s to today, lessons are commonly taught using chalkboards. Projected aids, such as the epidiascope and slide projectors, were introduced into the classrooms around the 1960s. With the growing use of computers, the medical field has begun to incorporate new devices and procedures to assist in teaching students, performing procedures, and analyzing patient data. As well as providing that data in a meaningful way to the patients.

Virtual reality 
Virtual reality is a platform for multimedia in which it merges all categories of multimedia into one virtual environment. It has gained much more attention over recent years following technological advancements and is becoming much more commonly used nowadays for various uses like virtual showrooms and video games. Virtual reality was first introduced in 1957 by cinematographer Morton Heilig in the form of an arcade-style booth called Sensorama. The first virtual reality headset was created by American computer scientist Ivan Sutherland and Bob Sproull, his student, in 1968. Virtual reality is used for educational and also recreational purposes like watching movies, interactive video games, simulations etc. Ford Motor Company uses this technology to show customers the interior and exterior of their cars via their Immersion Lab. In Pima County, Arizona their police force is trained by using Virtual Reality to create scenarios for police to practice in.In 1996 Nintendo released the Virtual Boy marking one of the first attempts at a mainstream virtual reality system. Many video game platforms now support virtual reality technology, including Sony's PlayStation, Nintendo's Switch as part of their Labo project, as well as the Oculus VR headsets that can be used for Xbox and PC gaming, with it being more preferable to pair with a PC due to it only being compatible with the original Xbox One and providing limited capabilities.

Augmented reality 

Augmented reality overlays digital content or output onto the real world, using media such as audio, animation, and text. Augmented reality became widely popular only in the 21st century; however, some of the earlier versions of such were things like the Sega Genesis Activator Controller back in 1992 which allowed users to literally stand in an octagon and control in game movement with physical movement or to stretch back even further the R.O.B. NES Robot back in 1984 which with its array of accessories was able to also provide users with the sensation of holding a firearm. These multimedia input devices are among some of the earliest of the augmented reality devices by allowing users to input commands to facilitate a different user experience. A more modern example of augmented reality is Pokémon GO, a mobile game released on July 6, 2016, which allows users to see a Pokémon in a real world environment.

See also 

 Animation
 Artmedia
 Audio
 Audiovisual
 Computer
 Images
 Internet
 Kraftwerk
 Multi-image
 Multimedia cartography
 Multimedia Messaging Service
 Multimedia search
 New media art
 Non-linear media
 Postliterate society
 Social media
 Text
 Transmedia storytelling
 Universal multimedia access
 Video
 Video Game
 Virtual Reality
 Web documentary

References

External links

History of Multimedia from the University of Calgary
Multimedia in Answers.com

 
Communication design
Design
Film and video terminology
Film production
1960s neologisms